The inferior mesenteric plexus is derived chiefly from the aortic plexus.

It surrounds the inferior mesenteric artery, and divides into a number of secondary plexuses, which are distributed to all the parts supplied by the artery, viz., the left colic and sigmoid plexuses, which supply the descending and sigmoid parts of the colon; and the superior hemorrhoidal plexus, which supplies the rectum and joins in the pelvis with branches from the pelvic plexuses.

Additional images

See also
 Inferior mesenteric artery
 Superior mesenteric plexus

References

External links
 
 
 

Nerve plexus
Nerves of the torso